Asteras Magoula Football Club is a Greek football club, based in Magoula, West Attica. It was officially founded in 1980.

Asteras spent the majority of its history in the Piraeus Football Clubs Association championships until 2003, when it joined the newly formed West Attica Football Clubs Association. On 25 June 2011, Asteras won the Greek Amateur Cup after beating Asteras Lianokladi 2–0. The same year, it was promoted to Football League 2 after finishing first in Group 7 of the 2010–11 Delta Ethniki.

References

External links
Unofficial club's website 

Football clubs in Attica
Association football clubs established in 1980
1980 establishments in Greece